Suzanne "Honey" Shepherd is an American actress and theater director.

Education 
Shepherd studied acting with Sanford Meisner, and later went on to teach Meisner's program of acting study, the first woman to do so.

Career 
She was a founding member of the Compass Players in the early 1960s, along with Alan Alda and Alan Arkin.

She is known for her portrayal of Karen's overbearing mother in the film Goodfellas, Carmela Soprano's mother Mary DeAngelis in the HBO television series The Sopranos, and the assistant school principal in Uncle Buck. She also played the role of Mrs. Scarlini in the film 2000 film Requiem for a Dream, and Big Ethel in A Dirty Shame. In 2016, she played the role of Lucille Abetemarco the mother of Detective Anthony Abetemarco played by former Sopranos co-star Steve Schirripa in "Good Cop Bad Cop" the second episode of the seventh season of the CBS police procedural drama Blue Bloods. In 2018, she reprised the role of Lucille Abetemarco in "Trust" the sixth episode of the ninth season of Blue Bloods.

Personal life 
Her daughter is artist Kate Shepherd.

Filmography

Film

Television

References

External links

American film actresses
American television actresses
Living people
Year of birth missing (living people)
21st-century American women